The Night Before Christmas, also known as Santa's Toys, is a 1933 American pre-Code animated short film produced by Walt Disney Productions and released by United Artists. Part of the Silly Symphony series, the film is an adaptation of Clement Clarke Moore's 1823 poem "A Visit from St. Nicholas", popularly called "The Night Before Christmas". The film was directed by Disney animator Wilfred Jackson.

Plot
In a loose adaptation of Clement C. Moore's famous poem, St. Nick is seen delivering the toys that he made in Disney's Santa's Workshop (1932) to a house full of sleeping children. The toys come alive, and they dance around and have fun. The kids awake to find a beautiful Christmas tree with many toys.

Home media
The short was released on DVD on December 19, 2006, on Walt Disney Treasures: More Silly Symphonies, Volume Two.

See also
 List of Christmas films

References

External links

1933 films
1933 short films
1930s Disney animated short films
Santa Claus in film
American Christmas films
Animated Christmas films
Films directed by Wilfred Jackson
Films produced by Walt Disney
Films scored by Leigh Harline
Silly Symphonies
1933 animated films
Films based on poems
Works based on A Visit from St. Nicholas
1930s Christmas films
1930s American films